The Dubai Gold Cup is a thoroughbred horse race held in Meydan Racecourse, Dubai, United Arab Emirates. It was first run in 2012 as part of Dubai World Cup night. It was initially a Group 3 race and has been run at Group 2 level since 2014.

The first running of the race was marred by the fatal injury sustained by Fox Hunt. The race was abandoned and rerun later that evening.

Records
Speed record:
 3:17.77 – Subjectivist (2021)

Most wins: 3 
 Vazirabad: (2016, 2017, 2018)

Most wins by a jockey (3):
 Christophe Soumillon: Vazirabad (2016, 2017, 2018)

Most wins by a trainer (3):
 Alain de Royer-Dupré: Vazirabad (2016, 2017, 2018)

Most wins by an owner (3)
 Aga Khan IV: Vazirabad (2016, 2017, 2018)
 Godolphin: Opinion Poll (2012), Cavalryman (2013), Cross Counter (2019)

Winners

See also
 List of United Arab Emirates horse races

References

Racing Post:

External links 
Dubai World Cup

Horse races in the United Arab Emirates
Recurring sporting events established in 2012
2012 establishments in the United Arab Emirates
Open long distance horse races